Andy Secore (born April 28, 1984) was a former lacrosse player for the Edmonton Rush in the National Lacrosse League. Secore also represented the Iroquois Nationals in international play. He is a former assistant coach of the Rochester Knighthawks.

Professional career
Andy Secore was drafted 20th overall in the 2005 NLL Daft by the Calgary Roughnecks but never made an appearance for the Roughnecks. Secore played for the Arizona Sting in his first two seasons before being drafted in the NLL 2007 dispersal draft to the Minnesota Swarm and was signed to a one-year contract. In his season with the Swarm he recorded 76 points in just 14 starts and was called to play in the All-Star Game but was unable to participate due to an injury. Secore then entered the NLL 2008 dispersal draft after the Sting were unable to resign him and was drafted second overall of the draft by the Edmonton Rush. He then spent his next three years with the Rush until retiring from the National Lacrosse League.

International career
Secore played for the Iroquois Nationals at the 2011 World Indoor Lacrosse Championship in the Czech Republic. The Nationals earned silver medals after losing to Team Canada in the final.

Statistics

References

External links
http://www.pointstreak.com/prostats/playerpage.html?playerid=668067 Retrieved 2015-05-26.
http://www.insidelacrosse.com/wire.php?id=1741 Retrieved 2015-05-26.
http://www.swarmitup.com/AndySecore.htm Retrieved 2015-05-26.

1984 births
Living people
Edmonton Rush players
Iroquois nations lacrosse players
Lacrosse people from Ontario
Canadian lacrosse players
National Lacrosse League All-Stars
Native American sportspeople
Sportspeople from Hamilton, Ontario
First Nations sportspeople